Racah's W-coefficients were introduced by Giulio Racah in 1942. These coefficients have a purely mathematical definition. In physics they are used in calculations involving the quantum mechanical description of angular momentum, for example in atomic theory.
 
The coefficients appear when there are three sources of angular momentum in the problem. For example, consider an atom with one electron in an s orbital and one electron in a p orbital. Each electron has electron spin angular momentum and in addition
the p orbital has orbital angular momentum (an s orbital has zero orbital angular momentum). The atom may be described by LS coupling or by jj coupling as explained in the article on angular momentum coupling. The transformation between the wave functions that correspond to these two couplings involves a Racah W-coefficient.

Apart from a phase factor, Racah's W-coefficients are equal to Wigner's 6-j symbols, so any equation involving Racah's W-coefficients may be rewritten using 6-j  symbols. This is often advantageous because the symmetry properties of 6-j symbols are easier to remember.

Racah coefficients are related to recoupling coefficients by

Recoupling coefficients are elements of a unitary transformation and their definition is given in the next section. Racah coefficients have more convenient symmetry properties than the recoupling coefficients (but less convenient than the 6-j symbols).

Recoupling coefficients
The result is 

Both coupling schemes result in complete orthonormal bases for the  dimensional space spanned by

Hence, the two total angular momentum bases are related by a unitary transformation. The matrix elements of this unitary transformation are given by a scalar product and are known as recoupling coefficients.

Algebra
Let

be the usual triangular factor, then the Racah coefficient is a product
of four of these by a sum over factorials,

where

and

Relation to Wigner's 6-j symbol
Racah's W-coefficients are related to Wigner's 6-j symbols, which have even more convenient symmetry properties

Cf. or

See also
 Clebsch–Gordan coefficients
 3-j symbol
 6-j symbol
 Pandya theorem

Notes

Further reading

External links
 

Rotational symmetry
Representation theory of Lie groups